Seo Min-woo is a South Korean professional footballer who plays as a midfielder for K League 1 side Gangwon.

Club career
Seo had previously played at Seoul E-Land before joining his former coach at Yeungnam University, Kim Byung-soo, at Gangwon of the K League 1. He made his professional debut for the club on 10 May 2020 in their opening match against FC Seoul. He started and played just the first half as Gangwon won 3–1.

Career statistics

Club

References

External links
Profile at the Gangwon FC website

1998 births
Living people
South Korean footballers
Association football forwards
Seoul E-Land FC players
Gangwon FC players
K League 1 players